In probability theory, the Feldman–Hájek theorem or Feldman–Hájek dichotomy is a fundamental result in the theory of Gaussian measures.
  and  have the same Cameron–Martin space ;
 the difference in their means lies in this common Cameron–Martin space, i.e. ;  and
 the operator  is a Hilbert–Schmidt operator on 

A simple consequence of the Feldman–Hájek theorem is that dilating a Gaussian measure on an infinite-dimensional Hilbert space  (i.e. taking  for some scale factor ) always yields two mutually singular Gaussian measures, except for the trivial dilation with  since  is Hilbert–Schmidt only when

See also

References

Probability theorems
Theorems in measure theory